The Men's Club is a 1986 American drama film directed by Peter Medak, based on the novel of the same name by Leonard Michaels. It stars Roy Scheider, Harvey Keitel, Frank Langella, Treat Williams, David Dukes and Richard Jordan. It is noted for a scene where Keitel (as Solly Berliner) assertively denies engaging in masturbation.

Plot
A band of friends go on a drunken, all-night spree, spending a night in a high-class San Francisco brothel.

Cast

David Dukes as Phillip
Richard Jordan as Kramer
Harvey Keitel as Solly Berliner
Frank Langella as Harold Canterbury
Roy Scheider as Cavanaugh
Craig Wasson as Paul
Treat Williams as Terry
Stockard Channing as Nancy
Gina Gallego as Felicia 
Cindy Pickett as Hannah
Gwen Welles as Redhead
Penny Baker as Lake
Rebeccah Bush as Stella
Claudia Cron as Stacey
Ann Dusenberry as Page
Marilyn Jones as Allison
Manette LaChance as Billy
Jennifer Jason Leigh as Teensy
Ann Wedgeworth as Jo
Laurie Ambert as Waitress
Joan Foley as Nurse
Kelly Haverur as Phoebe
Helen Shaver appears uncredited

References

External links

1986 films
1986 drama films
Atlantic Entertainment Group films
1980s English-language films
Films based on American novels
Films directed by Peter Medak
Films scored by Lee Holdridge
Films set in San Francisco
Films set in the San Francisco Bay Area
American drama films
1980s American films